The discography of Tokio, a Japanese rock/pop band, consists of twelve studio albums, one cover album, one remix album, three compilation albums, one mini album, and more than fifty singles released under Sony Music Entertainment, Universal Music, and J Storm.

Albums

Studio albums

Remix albums

Cover albums

Compilation albums

Extended plays

Singles

Indie singles

Theme songs and tie-ins
 "Ai no Arashi" – Psychometrer Eiji 2 theme song
 "Amagasa/Akirerukurai Bokura wa Negaou" – Yasuko to Kenji Theme Song/Mentore G theme song
 "Ambitious Japan!" – theme song for JR Central's nozomi train services
 "Boku no Renai Jijyou to Daidokoro Jijyou" – Mentore G Theme theme song
 "Cry for the Moon" - 0 Gōshitsu no Kyaku theme song from February to March 2010
 "Get Your Dream" – theme song in Japan for the 2006 FIFA World Cup
 "Dash Village" - DASH Village theme song (from The! Tetsuwan! Dash!!)
 "Ding Dong" – Yan Papa theme song
 "DR" – Handoku theme song
 "Everybody Can Do!" – Kochira Katsushika-ku Kameari Kōen-mae Hashutsujo second opening theme
 "Furarete Genki" – Psychometrer Eiji theme song
 "Haruka" - Dash Beach theme song (from The! Tetsuwan! Dash!!)
 "Heart o Migakukkyanai" – Tobe! Isami opening theme
 "Hikari no Machi/Run Free (Swan Dance o Kimi To)" – Skull Man theme song
 "Hitoribocchi no Haburashi" – Mukodono theme song
 "Hontontoko" - Kurokochi theme song
 "Jibun no Tameni" – Nurseman Ga Yuku theme song
 "Julia" – Seiji no Mikata theme song
 "Love & Peace" – Love and Peace theme song
 "Love Love Manhattan" – Manhattan Love Story theme song
 "Lyric" - Nakuna Hara-chan theme song
 "Mata Asa ga Kuru" - Romes theme song
 "Message" – Tengoku Ni Ichiban Chikai Otoko theme song
 "Mr. Traveling Man" – YAOH theme song
 "NaNaNa (Taiyo Nante Irane)" - Unubore Deka theme song
 "Seishun (Seisyun)" – Utahime theme song
 "Sorafune" – My Boss My Hero theme song
 "Subeki Koto" – 5LDK ending theme song
 "Taiyō to Sabaku no Bara" – Kareinaru Spy theme song
 "Transistor G (Glamour) Girl" – Kanojo ga Shinjatta theme song

Videography

Blu-Ray
 TOKIO 20th Anniversary Live Tour HEART (Released: 28 January 2015)

DVD
  (Released: 29 March 2000)
 Tokio Video Clips 2000 (Released: 29 March 2000)
 5 Round (Released: 22 May 2002)
  (Released: 7 August 2002) 
 5 Round II (Released: 19 May 2004)
 Tokio 10th Anniversary Live 2004 (Released: 12 January 2005)
  (Released: 16 November 2005)
 Tokio Special GIGs 2006: Get Your Dream (Released: 22 November 2006)
 5 Round III (Released: 31 January 2007)
 OVER/PLUS (Released: 14 September 2011)
 17.18 Live Tour(Released: 17 April 2013)
 TOKIO 20th Anniversary Live Tour HEART (Released: 28 January 2015)

VHS
 Tokio First Live Video: Bad Boys Bound 95 (Released: 23 November 1995)
 Tokio Live 1997 + Special Bonus Track 1998 (Released: 1 April 1998)
  (Released: 6 October 1999)
 Tokio Video Clips 2000 (Released: 29 March 2000)
 5 Round (Released: 22 May 2002)
  (Released: 7 August 2002)
 5 Round II (Released: 19 May 2004)
 Tokio 10th Anniversary Live 2004 (Released: 17 January 2005)

Notes

References
General

Specific

Tokio
Rock music group discographies
Pop music group discographies
Discography